Puebla Femenil is a Mexican women's football club based in Puebla. The club has been the female section of Club Puebla since 2018. The team plays in the Liga MX Femenil, the top-flight of women's football in Mexico.

The team was founded for the 2018–19 season of the Liga MX Femenil. Being one of the two clubs, with Lobos BUAP, that did not field a women's team for the inaugural season of the league.

Personnel

Management

Coaching staff

Players

Current squad
As of 16 July 2021

References

Association football clubs established in 2018
Women's association football clubs in Mexico
2018 establishments in Mexico